Trophon brevispira is a species of sea snail, a marine gastropod mollusk in the family Muricidae, the murex snails or rock snails.

Description
The shell can grow to be .

Distribution
It can be found off of the South Georgia Islands and Antarctica.

References

Gastropods described in 1885
Trophon